List of rulers of Transylvania, from the 10th century, until 1867.

Overview

Before 1556, the administration of the eastern parts of the Hungarian Kingdom, referred as Partes Transsylvana (Latin for "parts beyond the forests"), was in the hands of a voivode appointed by the king. The word voivod or voievod first appeared in historical documents in 1193. Prior to that, the term ispán was used for the chief official of the County of Fehér. The whole territory of Transylvania came under the jurisdiction of the voievod after 1263, when the functions of Count of Szolnok (Doboka) and Count of Fehér were terminated.

The Voivode of Transylvania (woyuoda Transsiluanus) was one of the barons of the kingdom. The voivode was, in effect, a territorial governor or viceroy appointed by the Hungarian crown. He was also the chief magistrate and military commander of Transylvania's seven counties. His jurisdiction, however, was limited, because the Transylvanian Saxons and the Hungarian-speaking Székelys were under the authority of royal officials specifically assigned to this task, the Count of Hermannstadt and the Count of the Székelys, respectively. Furthermore, the royal free cities also were exempted from the authority of the voivode.

In the 16th century, the conflict between Habsburgs and the Ottoman Empire allowed Transylvania to gain a certain independence as the Principality of Transylvania under Ottoman suzerainty until it was finally integrated into the Habsburg monarchy around 1700.  The Habsburg rulers continued to use the title Prince of Transylvania (and later Grand Prince of Transylvania) as part of their official title until the end of Austria-Hungary in 1918. The territory was administered by an appointed governor until 1867, when it was dissolved as an administrative unit in the wake of the Austro-Hungarian Ausgleich of 1867 and integrated into Hungary. At the dissolution of the Austro-Hungarian Empire in 1919, Transylvania, along with other regions of eastern Hungary, became part of the Kingdom of Romania. It was divided between Romania and Hungary in 1940 but reverted to Romania in 1945.

List

Early rulers

Royal appointees
 For a list of the members of the royal family bearing the title duke in the 13th and 14th centuries, see Duke of Transylvania.
 For the lists of great officials of the realm appointed by the monarchs to administer parts of Transylvania, and also for the list of the sovereigns appointing them, see
 Voivode of Transylvania, an article of royal officials responsible for the administration of the seven counties in the province from the end of the 12th century until the second half of the 16th century, including the first semi-autonomous rulers of Transylvania after the disintegration of the Kingdom of Hungary,
 Count of the Székelys, an article of royal officials appointed from the first half of the 13th century to the second half of the 15th century to lead the Székelys independently of the voivodes.

Semi-independent monarchs
 For a list of Princes of Transylvania (monarchs under Ottoman suzerainty), see List of Princes of Transylvania.

Habsburg monarchs and their governors
 For the lists of viceroys appointed by the Habsburg monarchs to administer the Principality (from 1765 Grand Principality) of Transylvania between 1691 and 1867, and also for the list of the sovereigns appointing them, see Governor of Transylvania.

External links
 Heraldique Europeenne including the coats-of-arms of Transylvania and its rulers 1526–1690

 
Transylvanian rulers
Transylvania
Transylvania
Transylvanian rulers